Rita Schmidt may refer to:
Rita Blankenburg, (Schmidt)  (born 1942), retired German speed skater
Rita Schmidt (rower), retired German rower 
Rita Kirst (née Schmidt) (born 1950), retired German high jumper